Bab Nem (also Romanized as Bāb Nem and Bāb Nam) is a village in Sarduiyeh Rural District, Sarduiyeh District, Jiroft County, Kerman Province, Iran. At the 2006 census, its population was 335, in 67 families.

References 

Populated places in Jiroft County